Sophronica rufiniceps is a species of beetle in the family Cerambycidae. It was described by Stephan von Breuning in 1949. It is known from the Central African Republic, Angola, the Ivory Coast, the Democratic Republic of the Congo, Cameroon, and Uganda.

Subspecies
 Sophronica rufiniceps dundensis Breuning, 1959
 Sophronica rufiniceps rufiniceps Breuning, 1949

References

Sophronica
Beetles described in 1949